Summer blend may refer to:

Summer blend, a type of Gasoline
Summer Blend, a variety of Black & Mild brand cigar
ITC Signature Summer Blend 2008, a variety of A. J. Fernandez Cigars
Summer Blend, a seasonal hard cider H. P. Bulmer
Summer Blend Tea, produced by Heichinrou